Michael Dowsett (born 23 March 1992) is an Australian rugby union player who plays as a scrum-half for the Jersey Reds in the RFU Championship.

Rugby career
A native of Sydney, Dowsett first came to prominence playing for Northern Suburbs during the Shute Shield and a strong showing during the 2013 season saw him earn a place in the  Extended Playing Squad for the 2014 Super Rugby season. He eventually made his Super Rugby debut on 25 April 2014 as a late substitute for Nic White as the Brumbies defeated the  41-23 in Canberra. He joined the NSW Country Eagles for the 2015 National Rugby Championship. In the 2015 Super Rugby season, Dowsett was a second-half substitute during the semi final defeat against the Hurricanes.

In 2016, Dowsett featured for New Zealand side Southland Stags in the  Mitre 10 Cup. In November 2016, Dowsett joined Aviva Premiership side the Worcester Warriors on a short term deal. On 24 March 2017, Dowsett signed a permanent deal. He scored on his debut for the club in an Anglo-Welsh Cup victory against Bristol. Dowsett is qualified to represent England.

On 13 June 2020, Dowsett returns to England to join Jersey Reds in the RFU Championship for the 2020-21 season.

Super Rugby statistics

References

1992 births
Living people
Australian rugby union players
ACT Brumbies players
Canberra Vikings players
Southland rugby union players
Worcester Warriors players
New South Wales Country Eagles players
Rugby union players from Sydney
Rugby union scrum-halves
Australian people of English descent
People educated at Scots College (Sydney)